"Ed ero contentissimo" (translated in English: "And I was very glad") is a pop song written by Italian pop singer Tiziano Ferro. It was released as the second single from his third studio album Nessuno è solo (2006) and achieved huge success in Italy. Y estaba contentísimo, the Spanish version of the song, was released in Spain and other Spanish-speaking countries.

Track listing
CD and digital download:
 Ed ero contentissimo
 Y estaba contentisimo

Charts

Peak positions

References

2006 singles
Italian-language songs
Tiziano Ferro songs
Songs written by Tiziano Ferro
2006 songs
EMI Records singles
Pop ballads
Song recordings produced by Michele Canova